Lohinov is a surname. Notable people with the surname include: 

Oleksandr Lohinov (born 1991), Ukrainian football player
Serhiy Lohinov (born 1990), Ukrainian football player

See also
Loginov